The 1981 Harvard Crimson football team was an American football team that represented Harvard University during the 1981 NCAA Division I-A football season. Harvard finished fourth in the Ivy League.

In their 11th year under head coach Joe Restic, the Crimson compiled a 5–4–1 record and outscored opponents 218 to 173. Peter M. Coppinger was the team captain.

Harvard's 4–2–1 conference record placed fourth in the Ivy League standings. The Crimson outscored Ivy opponents 163 to 99. 

This would be Harvard's last season in the NCAA's top level of football competition. Shortly after the season ended, the NCAA reassigned all of the Ivy League teams to the second-tier Division I-AA, which would later be renamed the Football Championship Subdivision.

Harvard played its home games at Harvard Stadium in the Allston neighborhood of Boston, Massachusetts.

Schedule

References

Harvard
Harvard Crimson football seasons
Harvard Crimson football
Harvard Crimson football